Tailenders (also known as Trailfinders) is a podcast and sometime BBC radio show which is nominally centered around the world of cricket. The show is presented by BBC Radio 1 DJ Greg James with ex-Maccabees guitarist Felix White and England international cricketer James Anderson. After its hundredth episode Esquire magazine called it “a phenomenon”, and it has also been labelled “one of the most successful in the country”, and “funny and entertaining” by The Guardian. It has been named in the podcasts of the week by The Week, and The Radio Times, as well as recommended in the i (newspaper), and Time Out. The Times included Tailenders in their ‘25 best podcasts of 2022’.

In 2019 the BBC announced 2.5 million listeners for Tailenders from its BBC Sounds App. In 2020, at the British Podcast Awards, the show was nominated for the Best Live Episode  and was awarded "gold". At the 2020 Audio and Radio Industry Awards (ARIAS), the show won the bronze award for Best Sports Show.

The show is made with help from producer Mark 'Sharky' Sharman (AKA Sharknado the Movie), and regular input from Bristolian Matt ‘Mattchin’ Horan (nicknamed ‘Mattchin’ due to his relation by marriage to Indian cricketing great Sachin Tendulkar). Horan, much to the delight of the worldwide Tailenders community, was named the 38th coolest person in Bristol in 2020, climbing up to 11th spot in 2021. This is purported to be one of Horan's proudest achievements.

The podcast has spawned live performances at places such as the Hackney Empire (Jack Leach Empire) and The Palace Theatre and catchphrases such as "Go Well", "Cheers", "#tailendersoftheworlduniteandtakeover" and "bit spicy that".

Tailenders is less about the podcast and more about the family. Grumpy Uncle Jimmy, the unendingly articulate Felix and the ever-enthusiastic Mattchin are glued together by G-Force's wit and Sharky's editorial skills (fueled by the occasional beer, hand-delivered by his son, Will).

Most people who can be 'identified' as 'Tailenders' are generally known to end conversations with 'Go Well' or 'Cheers'. Those who have listened to the podcast have been known to comment under Michael Vaughan's tweets, with mango and chili emojis. They send in correspondence to Greg, Felix and Jimmy relating to paper shredders, printers and other general correspondence, and create banners with the known hashtags on them and show them at cricket grounds across the world. Their 'Project Mobilization' vision is to show a banner portraying the hashtag, '#tailendersoftheworlduniteandtakeover', in every current Test ground (with the addition Bramall Lane) across the world.

Through the podcast, a charity foundation - the Go Well Fund - was created to raise money during the COVID-19 pandemic. The Tailenders went well (cheers), and raised a substantial sum for charitable causes. Go well.

References

Audio podcasts